Volleyball World Cup may refer to
 FIVB Volleyball Men's World Cup
 FIVB Volleyball Women's World Cup